The Land Titles Building is located at 301 Main Street in  Arcola, Saskatchewan, Canada.   The architectural firm of Storey and Van Egmond designed the building.  The building is a designated Heritage Property. The building housed land title records until the 1960s; due to the importance of these records the building was designed to be fire-proof and therefore the walls, floor, ceiling and doors were all made of metal, brick or stone.

See also
Canadian Register of Historic Places

References

Government buildings completed in 1912
Buildings and structures in Saskatchewan
1912 establishments in Saskatchewan
Heritage sites in Saskatchewan